The inferior or orbital surface of the frontal lobe is concave, and rests on the orbital plate of the frontal bone. It is divided into four orbital gyri by a well-marked H-shaped orbital sulcus

Additional Images

References 

Sulci (neuroanatomy)
Frontal lobe